This is a list of the  cotton and other textile mills in the Borough of Bury, Greater Manchester, England, which comprises Bury, Ramsbottom, Tottington, Radcliffe, Whitefield and Prestwich.

Mills A-B

Mills C-D

Mills E-F

Mills G-H-I-J

Mills K-L

Mills M-N-O

Mills P-Q-R-S

Mills T-U-V

Mills W-X-Y-Z

References

Bibliography

External links

 
Bury
Bury